The Roman Catholic Diocese of Xiamen/Amoy/Hsíamen is a diocese located in the city of Xiamen (Fujian) in the Ecclesiastical province of Fuzhou in China.

History
 December 3, 1883: Established as Apostolic Vicariate of Amoy 廈門 from the Apostolic Vicariate of Northern Fo-kien 福建北境
 April 11, 1946: Promoted as Diocese of Xiamen 廈門

Leadership
 Bishops of Xiamen 廈門 (Roman rite)
 Bishop Joseph Cai Bingrui (2010–present)
 Bishop Joseph Huang Ziyu (1986–1991) 
 Bishop Juan Bautista Velasco Díaz, O.P. (June 10, 1948–May 1983)
 Bishop Manuel Prat Pujoldevall, O.P. (April 11, 1946–January 6, 1947)
 Vicars Apostolic of Amoy 廈門 (Roman Rite)
 Bishop Manuel Prat Pujoldevall, O.P.(January 27, 1916–April 11, 1946)
 Bishop Isidoro Clemente Gutiérrez, O.P. (August 7, 1899–August 10, 1915.)
 Bishop Esteban Sánchez de las Heras, O.P. (January 19, 1895–June 21, 1896)
 Bishop Ignacio Ibáñez, O.P. (May 4, 1893–October 14, 1893)
 Bishop Andrés Chinchón, O.P. (December 11, 1883–May 1, 1892)

References

 GCatholic.org
 Catholic Hierarchy

Roman Catholic dioceses in China
Religious organizations established in 1883
Roman Catholic dioceses and prelatures established in the 19th century
Christianity in Fujian
Xiamen